USNS Timber Hitch (T-AGM-17) was a US Navy missile range instrumentation ship which earlier operated as the US Air Force Ocean Range Vessel USAFS Timber Hitch (ORV-17) on the US Air Force's Eastern Test Range during the late 1950s and early 1960s. Timber Hitch operated under an Air Force contract with  Pan American Airways Guided Missile Range Division headquartered in Cocoa Beach, Florida.

Timber Hitch, assigned to the South Atlantic Ocean and the Caribbean area, provided the Air Force with metric data on intercontinental ballistic missiles launched from the Cape Canaveral Air Force Station (CCAFS) in Florida.

Timber Hitch operated in the intercontinental ballistic missile re-entry area near Ascension Island, and was home-ported out of Recife, Brazil.

Construction
SS Timber Hitch was laid down 26 August 1944, under a Maritime Commission (MARCOM) contract, MC hull 2315, by the Consolidated Steel Corporation, Ltd., Wilmington, California; she was sponsored by Mrs. Paul N. Mulvany, the wife of the assistant chief of the Construction & Inspection section at the regional office of MARCOM, and was launched on 10 October 1944.

Acquisition by the Navy
Timber Hitch was acquired from the US Air Force by the US Navy, on 1 July 1964.

Operational data
Operational data while on US Navy service during post-1964 period on this vessel is lacking.

Inactivation
Timber Hitch was struck from the Navy List 9 October 1969. She was sold for scrapping, 27 July 1977, along with three other ships, for $309,999. She was withdrawn from the fleet on 21 October 1977.

See also
 Missile Range Instrumentation Ship
 List of ships of the United States Air Force
 Eastern Test Range
 Pan American Airways Guided Missile Range Division
 Missile Test Project

References

Bibliography

 
 
 

 

Type C1-M ships
Ships built in Los Angeles
1944 ships
World War II merchant ships of the United States
Type C1-M ships of the United States Air Force
Type C1-M ships of the United States Navy
Cold War auxiliary ships of the United States
Signals intelligence
Missile range instrumentation ships of the United States Navy
Research vessels of the United States Navy